A divorce settlement is an arrangement, adjustment, or other understanding reached, as in financial or business proceedings, between two adults who have chosen to divorce. It serves as the final legal agreement between these adults for documenting the terms of their divorce.

Specifics 
A divorce settlement entails which spouse gets what property and what responsibilities once the marriage is over. "It deals with child custody and visitation, child support, alimony, health and life insurance, real estate, cars, household items, bank accounts, debts, investments, retirement plans and pensions, college tuition for children, and other items of value, such as frequent flyer miles and country club memberships. Conditions regarding tax payments, legal names, and provisions for modifying the agreement may also be included."

See also 
Settlement (litigation)
List of largest divorce settlements

References

Divorce